is a Japanese actor.

He originated the role of Kaoru Kaidoh as part of the first generation Seigaku cast in The Prince of Tennis musical series (commonly called Tenimyu). He also played Shūhei Hisagi in Rock Musical Bleach. He also did voice work for Eyeshield 21 as Seijuro Shin.

Gomoto reprised his role as Kaidoh and reunited with the majority first Seigaku cast to perform in Tenimyus Dream Live 7th concert to celebrate the end of the series' first season.

Notable works

Television
 Tokusou Sentai Dekaranger - Bileezian Vino/Gigantes
 Yowamushi Pedal Live Action - Shingo Kinjou

Anime
 Eyeshield 21 - Seijuro Shin
 Reborn! - Zakuro

MusicalRock Musical Bleach – Shuhei HisagiMusical Hakuouki: Kazama Chikage Arc – Amagiri KyuujuuYowamushi Pedal Stage – Shingo KinjouTenimyu: The Prince Of Tennis Musical Series (as Kaoru Kaidoh)'''
 The Prince of Tennis Musical (2003)
 The Prince of Tennis Musical: Remarkable 1st Match Fudomine (2003–2004)
 The Prince of Tennis Musical: Dream Live 1st (2004)
 The Prince of Tennis Musical: More Than Limit St. Rudolph Gakuen (2004)
 The Prince of Tennis Musical: Side Fudomine ~Special Match~ (In Winter of 2004-2005)
 The Prince of Tennis Musical'': Dream Live 7th (2010)

References

External links
  

Japanese male actors
1980 births
Living people